"Osinachi" is a song by Nigerian afropop recording artist Humblesmith. It is referenced as the song that shot Humblesmith's music career to limelight.

Composition
"Osinachi" (English: from God) is a gospel-afro pop-infused highlife song. The lyrical content centres on thanksgiving and appreciation to God. In an interview with The Sun, Humblesmith revealed that he got the inspiration for the song in a church.

Reception
Upon its release on 10 August 2015, "Osinachi" was received to positive reviews and gained rotational airplay in Nigeria. At the 2016 Nigeria Entertainment Awards, the song was nominated in the "Hottest Single" category.

Remix version

The remix version of the song was released on 8 January 2016 and features guest vocals from Nigerian recording artist Davido.

Controversy
Following the release of the remix version of "Osinachi", the local media criticised Davido for using the song as a way of addressing personal issues he had with Sophia and Dele Momodu, Momodu later debunked suggestions of discord between him and Davido and further stated that, "Davido is my son and so you can’t have issues with your son".

Music video
The music video for the first version of the song was directed by Adasa Cookey and was shot at different locations in Lagos State. It premiered on 11 September 2015 via video-sharing website YouTube. On 31 January 2016, the music video for the remix was released. It was shot by Clarence Peters.

Release history

Accolades

References

External links

2015 songs
2016 songs
Songs written by Davido